Sir David Lee Pearson  (born 4 February 1974) is a 14-times Paralympic Games gold medallist, having represented British para-equestrianism in Sydney, Athens, Beijing, London, Rio, and Tokyo. Over the course of his career he has won 30 gold medals at European, World and Paralympic level.

Biography
Pearson was born with arthrogryposis multiplex congenita and first came to public attention in 1980, when British Prime Minister Margaret Thatcher carried him up stairs in 10 Downing Street having awarded him a 'Children of Courage' medal.

Pearson turned professional after he was inspired by the Atlanta Olympics. He won three gold medals in the championship dressage, freestyle dressage, and team dressage events at the 2000, 2004 and 2008 Summer Paralympics. He won gold in the team dressage event at the 2012 Summer Paralympics, silver in the championship dressage and bronze in the freestyle.

He noted after his failure to win gold in the freestyle competition in London that he had been voted down by the British judge but said that he would compete at the 2016 Summer Paralympics in Rio, on a different horse.

Competition record

Honours
Pearson was awarded an honorary Doctorate from Staffordshire University in July 2005.

He was appointed Member of the Order of the British Empire (MBE) in the 2001 New Year Honours for services to disabled sports, Officer of the Order of the British Empire (OBE) in the 2005 New Year Honours for services to equestrianism and to disabled sport, and Commander of the Order of the British Empire (CBE) in the 2009 New Year Honours for services to equestrianism and to disabled sport. He was knighted in the 2017 New Year Honours for services to equestrianism.

Personal life
Pearson runs his own dressage yard in Staffordshire and teaches many around the country. Lee Pearson was born in Cheddleton, England. Pearson was the first openly gay member of the British team and is an advocate for LGBTQ+ rights. In 2020, he became a single foster parent to a 15-year-old foster son.

See also
 2012 Paralympics gold post boxes

References

External links 

 
 

1974 births
Living people
British male equestrians
British dressage riders
Paralympic equestrians of Great Britain
Paralympic gold medalists for Great Britain
Paralympic silver medalists for Great Britain
Paralympic medalists in equestrian
Equestrians at the 2000 Summer Paralympics
Equestrians at the 2004 Summer Paralympics
Equestrians at the 2008 Summer Paralympics
Equestrians at the 2012 Summer Paralympics
Equestrians at the 2016 Summer Paralympics
Medalists at the 2000 Summer Paralympics
Medalists at the 2004 Summer Paralympics
Medalists at the 2008 Summer Paralympics
Medalists at the 2012 Summer Paralympics
Medalists at the 2016 Summer Paralympics
Commanders of the Order of the British Empire
English LGBT sportspeople
People with arthrogryposis
Gay sportsmen
LGBT equestrians
People in sports awarded knighthoods
Knights Bachelor
Medalists at the 2020 Summer Paralympics
Equestrians at the 2020 Summer Paralympics